Januarius (Neapolitan and ), also known as , was Bishop of Benevento and is a martyr and saint of the Catholic Church and the Eastern Orthodox Church. While no contemporary sources on his life are preserved, later sources and legends claim that he died during the Great Persecution, which ended with Diocletian's retirement in 305.

Januarius is the patron saint of Naples, where the faithful gather three times a year in Naples Cathedral to witness the liquefaction of what is claimed to be a sample of his blood kept in a sealed glass ampoule.

Life
Little is known of the life of Januarius, and what follows is mostly derived from later Christian sources, such as the Acta Bononensia (BHL 4132, not earlier than 6th century) and the Acta Vaticana (BHL 4115, 9th century), and from later folk traditions.

Legend

According to various hagiographies, Januarius was born in Benevento to a rich patrician family that traced its descent to the Caudini tribe of the Samnites. At a young age of 15, he became local priest of his parish in Benevento, which at the time was relatively pagan. When Januarius was 20, he became Bishop of Naples and befriended Juliana of Nicomedia and Saint Sossius whom he met during his priestly studies. During the -year-long persecution of Christians by Emperor Diocletian, he hid his fellow Christians and prevented them from being caught. Unfortunately, while visiting Sossius in jail, he too was arrested. He and his colleagues were condemned to be thrown to wild bears in the Flavian Amphitheater at Pozzuoli, but the sentence was changed due to fear of public disturbances, and they were instead beheaded at the Solfatara crater near Pozzuoli. Other legends state either that the wild beasts refused to eat them, or that he was thrown into a furnace but came out unscathed.

History
The earliest extant mention of him is contained in a 432 letter by Uranius, bishop of Nola, on the death of his mentor Saint Paulinus of Nola, where it is stated that the ghosts of Januarius and Saint Martin appeared to Paulinus three days before the latter's death in 431. About Januarius, the account says only that he was "bishop as well as martyr, an illustrious member of the Neapolitan church".  The Acta Bononensia says that "At Pozzuoli in Campania [is honored the memory] of the holy martyrs Januarius, Bishop of Beneventum, Festus his deacon, and Desiderius lector, together with Sossius deacon of the church of Misenum, Proculus, deacon of Pozzuoli, Eutyches, and Acutius, who after chains and imprisonment were beheaded under the emperor Diocletian".

Legacy

Celebrations

The Feast of St Januarius or San Gennaro is celebrated on 19 September in the calendar of the Catholic Church. In the Eastern Church, it is celebrated on 21 April.  The city of Naples has more than fifty official patron saints, although its principal patron is Saint Januarius.

In the United States, the "Feast of San Gennaro" is also a highlight of the year for New York's Little Italy, with the saint's polychrome statue carried through the middle of a street fair stretching for blocks.

Relics

According to an early hagiography, Januarius's relics were transferred by order of Saint Severus, Bishop of Naples, to the Neapolitan catacombs "outside the walls". In the early ninth century the body was moved to Beneventum by Sico, prince of Benevento, with the head remaining in Naples. Subsequently, during the turmoil at the time of Frederick Barbarossa, his body was moved again, this time to the Territorial Abbey of Montevergine where it was rediscovered in 1480.

At the instigation of Cardinal Oliviero Carafa, his body was finally transferred in 1497 to Naples, where he is the city's patron saint. Carafa commissioned a richly decorated crypt, the Succorpo, beneath the cathedral to house the reunited body and head properly. The Succorpo was finished in 1506 and is considered one of the prominent monuments of the High Renaissance in the city.

Blood
Saint Januarius is famous for the annual liquefaction of his blood, which, according to legend, was saved by a woman called Eusebia just after the saint's death. A chronicle of Naples written in 1382 describes the cult of Saint Januarius in detail, but mentions neither the relic nor the miracle. The first certain date is 1389, when it was found to have melted. Then, over the following two and a half centuries official reports began to appear declaring that the blood spontaneously melted, at first once a year, then twice, and finally three times a year. While the report of the very first incidence of liquefaction did not make any explicit reference to the skull of the saint, soon afterwards assertions began to appear that this relic was activating the melting process, as if the blood, recognizing a part of the body to which it belonged, "were impatient while waiting for its resurrection". This explanation was definitively abandoned only in the eighteenth century.<ref>de Ceglia Francesco Paolo, "Thinking with the Saint: The Miracle of Saint Januarius of Naples and Science in Early Modern Europe" in Early Science and Medicine 19 (2014), p. 133-173</ref>

Thousands of people assemble to witness this event in Naples Cathedral three times a year: on September 19 (Saint Januarius's Day, commemorating his martyrdom), on December 16 (celebrating his patronage of Naples and its archdiocese), and on the Saturday before the first Sunday of May (commemorating the reunification of his relics).

The blood is also said to spontaneously liquefy at certain other times, such as papal visits. It supposedly liquefied in the presence of Pope Pius IX in 1848, but not that of John Paul II in 1979 or Benedict XVI in 2007. On March 21, 2015, Pope Francis venerated the dried blood during a visit to Naples Cathedral, saying the Lord's Prayer over it and kissing it. Archbishop Sepe then declared that "The blood has half liquefied, which shows that Saint Januarius loves our pope and Naples."

Ritual liquefaction

The blood is stored in two hermetically sealed small ampoules, held since the 17th century in a silver reliquary between two round glass plates about 12 cm wide. The smaller, cylindrical ampoule contains only a few reddish spots on its walls, the bulk having allegedly been removed and taken to Spain by Charles III. The larger, almond-shaped ampoule, with a capacity of about 60 ml, is about 60% filled with a dark reddish substance. Separate reliquaries hold bone fragments believed to belong to Saint Januarius.

For most of the time, the ampoules are kept in a bank vault, whose keys are held by a commission of local notables, including the mayor of Naples; the bones are kept in a crypt under the main altar of Naples Cathedral. On feast days, all these relics are taken in procession from the cathedral to the Monastery of Santa Chiara, where the archbishop holds up the reliquary and tilts it to show that the contents are solid, then places it on the high altar next to the saint's other relics. After intense prayers by the faithful, including the so-called "relatives of Saint Januarius" (parenti di San Gennaro), the content of the larger vial typically appears to liquify. The archbishop then holds up the vial and tilts it again to demonstrate that liquefaction has taken place. The announcement of the liquifaction is greeted with at the 13th-century Castel Nuovo. The ampoules remain exposed on the altar for eight days, while the priests move or turn them periodically to show that the contents remain liquid. Sir Francis Ronalds gives a detailed description of the May 1819 ritual in his travel journal.

The liquifaction sometimes takes place almost immediately, but can take hours or even days. Records kept at the Duomo tell that on rare occasions the contents fail to liquify, are found already liquified when the ampoules are taken from the safe, or liquify outside the usual dates.

Scientific studies
While the Catholic Church has always supported the celebrations, it has never formulated an official statement on the phenomenon and maintains a neutral stance about scientific investigations. It does not permit the vials to be opened, for fear that doing so may cause irreparable damage. This makes close analysis impossible. Nevertheless, a spectroscopic analysis performed in 1902 by Gennaro Sperindeo claimed that the spectrum was consistent with hemoglobin. A later analysis, with similar conclusions, was carried out by a team in 1989. However, the reliability of these observations has been questioned.  While clotted blood can be liquefied by mechanical stirring, the resulting suspension cannot solidify again.

Measurements made in 1900 and 1904 claimed that the ampoules' weight increased by up to 28 grams during liquefaction. However, later measurements with a precision balance, performed over five years, failed to detect any variation.

Various suggestions for the content's composition have been advanced, such as a material that is photosensitive, hygroscopic, or has a low melting point.Henri Broch. Le Paranormal (1985); ed. ext., Paris, Seuil, 1989, p. 109  However, these explanations run into technical difficulties, such as the variability of the phenomenon and its lack of correlation to ambient temperature.

A recent hypothesis by Garlaschelli & al. is that the vial contains a thixotropic gel,; In such a substance viscosity increases if left unstirred and decreases if stirred or moved.  Researchers have proposed specifically a suspension of hydrated iron oxide, FeO(OH), which reproduces the color and behavior of the 'blood' in the ampoule.  The suspension can be prepared from simple chemicals that would have been easily available locally since antiquity.

In 2010, Giuseppe Geraci, a professor in the Department of Molecular Biology at Naples's Frederick II University, conducted an experiment on a vial containing old blood—a relic dating back to the 18th century from the Eremo di Camaldoli near Arezzo in Tuscany—having the same characteristics of the blood of St. Januarius. Prof. Geraci showed that the Camaldoli relic also contains blood that can change its solid-liquid phase by shaking. He further reproduced the phenomenon with his own blood stored in the same conditions as the Camaldoli relic. He stated that, "There is no univocal scientific fact that explains why these changes take place. It is not enough to attribute to the movement the ability to dissolve the blood, the liquid contained in the Treasure case changes state for reasons still to be identified."
 He ultimately argued that "there's blood, no miracle".

Similar rites
Although Naples became known as "City of Blood" (''), legends of blood liquefaction are not a unique phenomenon. Other examples include vials of the blood of Saint Patricia and Saint John the Baptist in the monastery of San Gregorio Armeno, and of Saint Pantaleon in Ravello. In all, the church has recognized claims of miraculous liquefying blood for seven or about twenty saints from Campania and virtually nowhere else. The blood cults of the other saints have been discontinued since the 16th century, which noted skeptic James Randi takes as evidence that local artisans or alchemists had a secret recipe for manufacturing this type of relic. A team of three Italian chemists managed to create a liquid that reproduces all the characteristics and behavior of the liquid in the vial, using only local materials and techniques that were known to medieval workers. Jordan Lancaster leaves open the possibility that the practice was a Christian survival of a pagan ritual intended to protect the locals from unexpected eruptions from Mount Vesuvius.

Museum of the Treasure of St. Januarius

The Treasure of St Januarius is a collection of magnificent works and donations collected in seven centuries from popes, kings, emperors, famous and ordinary people. According to studies done by a pool of experts who have analyzed all the pieces in the collection, the Treasure of St Januarius is of higher value than the crown of Queen Elizabeth II of the United Kingdom and the Tsar of Russia. The Treasure is a unique collection of art masterpieces, kept untouched thanks to the Deputation of the Chapel of St Januarius, an ancient secular institution founded in 1527 by a vote of the city of Naples, still existing.

Today, the Treasure is exhibited in the Museum of the Treasure of St Januarius, whose entrance is located on the right side of the Dome of Naples, under the arcades. By visiting the museum, the Chapel of San Gennaro is accessible even when the cathedral is closed.

See also

 Feast of San Gennaro, as held annually in New York, Los Angeles, and Las Vegas
 Order of St. Januarius
 Museum of the Treasure of St Januarius
 Saint Januarius, patron saint archive

Notes

References

External links
CICAP: "The Blood of St. Januarius"
San Gennaro
New York's Feast of San Gennaro
The Blood Still Boils by Doug Skinner, Fate, July 2006

Year of birth unknown
Year of death uncertain
3rd-century births
305 deaths
4th-century Italian bishops
Bishops of Naples
4th-century Christian martyrs
3rd-century Romans
Christians martyred during the reign of Diocletian